

League tables

First Division
Nissan won a second title, spurred by increasing links between the team, its parent company and their hometown, Yokohama. Fujita Industries and Hitachi were relegated.

Second Division
Fallen giant Mitsubishi and struggler Toyota Motors returned to the top flight. Mazda Auto Hiroshima, who had been put as an A-squad to rival its parent company, and Teijin went back to their regional leagues (Chugoku and Shikoku, respectively).

Japan Soccer League seasons
1989 in Japanese football leagues
1990 in Japanese football leagues
Japan Soccer League